The 2014–15 Österreichische Basketball Bundesliga was the 69th season of the Österreichische Basketball Bundesliga. 10 teams participated this season, after St. Pölten left the league.

The season started on September 25, 2014 and ended on June 3, 2015. Güssing Knights repeated as the national champion by beating BC Zepter Vienna 1–3 in the Finals.

Teams
Chin Min Dragons from St. Pölten left the league this season.

Regular season

Standings

Rounds 1-18

Rounds 19-36

Playoffs

Awards
MVP:  Travis Taylor – Güssing Knights
Finals MVP:  Christopher Dunn – Güssing Knights
Austrian MVP:  Thomas Klepeisz – Güssing Knights
Coach of the Year:  Matthias Zollner – Güssing Knights
This season, three new awards were announced by the ABL.
Top scorer:  Marko Car – Panthers Fürstenfeld
Rising Star:  Daniel Friedrich – Swans Gmunden
ÖBL Defensive Player of the Year:  Moritz Lanegger – Xion Dukes Klosterneuburg

Notes

References
General''Specific'''

Österreichische Basketball Bundesliga seasons
Austrian
Lea